Cheryl L. Clarke (born Washington DC, May 16, 1947) is an American lesbian poet, essayist, educator and a Black feminist community activist who continues to dedicate her life to the recognition and advancement of Black and Queer people. Her scholarship focuses on African-American women's literature, black lesbian feminism, and the Black Arts Movement in the United States. For over 40 years, Cheryl Clarke worked at Rutgers, the State University of New Jersey, and maintains a teaching affiliation with the Graduate Faculty of the Department of Women and Gender Studies, though retired. In addition, Clarke serves on the board of the Newark Pride Alliance. She currently lives in Hobart, N.Y., the Book Village of the Catskills, after having spent much of her life in New Jersey. With her life partner, Barbara Balliet, she is co-owner of Bleinheim Hill Books, a new, used, and rare bookstore in Hobart. Actively involved in her community, Clarke along with her sister Breena Clarke, a novelist, organize the Hobart Festival of Women Writers each September

Early life and education

The daughter of James Sheridan Clarke (September 18, 1912 – January 18, 2009), a veteran of World War II, and Edna Clarke, Cheryl was born and raised in Washington, D.C. at the height of the American civil rights movement, one of four sisters and a brother. The family was Catholic, descended from freed slaves who had emigrated to the nation's capitol after the Civil War. Both parents were civil servants and registered Democrats: James Clarke worked for the National Bureau of Standards for 33 years, and was considered to be the "mayor" of their neighborhood in the NW section of Washington. Experiencing Jim Crow segregation first hand in Washington for much of their lives, James and Edna raised their children with a strong sense of social justice and a belief in the importance of political activism.

When she was 13, Clarke crossed a picket line of African-American activists protesting segregation at Woolworth's on 14th Street, believing that this was a rebellious act. However, when she came home her mother, a staunch union member, told her never to cross a picket line again, educating her about the role of direct action politics in the civil rights movement. At 16, Clarke was allowed by her parents to attend the 1963 March on Washington for Jobs and Freedom with them, despite their concerns that there might be violence. The day before the march, on the way downtown to acquire information about the route, she ran into Martin Luther King Jr., who would deliver his "I Have a Dream" speech the next day.

Clarke attended parochial schools in the District of Columbia, and matriculated at Howard University in 1965. She received a B.A. in English literature in 1969. Subsequently, she enrolled at Rutgers University, completing a master's degree in 1974, an MSW in 1980, and a Ph.D in 2000. For much of this time, she also worked for Rutgers, beginning her employment there in 1970 as an administrator in student services. At Rutgers, Clarke was a pioneer in co-curricular programming that made the university more accessible to students of color and LGBT students. In 1992, she was  the founding Director of Diverse Community Affairs and Lesbian/Gay Concerns, which became the Office for Social Justice Education and LGBT Communities in 2004. She served as the Dean of Students of the Livingston Campus at Rutgers University from 2009 to 2013. After 41 years in higher education, Clarke retired from Rutgers in 2013.

Writing

Clarke is the author of four collections of poetry: Narratives: Poems in the Tradition of Black Women (originally self-published in 1981 and distributed by Kitchen Table: Women of Color Press in 1982); and for Firebrand Books Living as a Lesbian (1986), Humid Pitch (1989) and Experimental Love (1993).

She also published After Mecca — Women Poets and the Black Arts Movement (Rutgers University Press, 2005), the first study of its kind that made more visible the contributions of black women to a field that traditionally recognized black men, and Days of Good Looks: Prose and Poetry, 1980–2005 (Carroll & Graf Publishing, 2006), a collection that represented 25 years of published writing.

Clarke has served on the editorial collective of Conditions, an early lesbian publication, and has been published in numerous anthologies, journals, magazines, and newspapers, including Conditions 5, The Black Women's Issue (1979), This Bridge Called My Back: Writings by Radical Women of Color (1982), Home Girls: A Black Feminist Anthology (1984), The Black Scholar, The Kenyon Review, Feminist Review of Books, Belles Lettres, The Gay Community News. Clarke's iconic articles, "Lesbianism: an act of resistance" and "The Failure to Transform: Homophobia in the Black Community", published in This Bridge and Home Girls, respectively, are often included in women studies, black studies, and English studies curricula.

Clarke's fifth book of poetry, By My Precise Haircut (2016), is published by The Word Works Books of Washington, D.C., a press committed to the publication of contemporary poetry.

“Lesbianism: an Act of Resistance” (1981) 
Cheryl Clarke is the author of "Lesbianism: an Act of Resistance," originally published in 1981 in the feminist anthology This Bridge Called My Back: Writings by Radical Women of Color. The essay's main intervention is to expand the categories of who counts as a lesbian and what lesbianism is. Rather than defining a lesbian only as a woman who has sex with other women, Clarke insists that "there is no one kind of lesbian, no one kind of lesbian behavior, and no one kind of lesbian relationship." Thinking of "lesbian" as a continuum, she makes space for women who may have sexual and emotional relationships with women but identify with other labels (bisexual, for instance). In the same way, she redefines lesbianism "as an ideological, political, and philosophical means of liberation of all women from heterosexual tyranny." Because she imagines lesbianism to be in opposition to male tyranny and coerced heterosexuality, she defines it as resistance, no matter how a woman is actually practicing it in her personal life.

“The Failure to Transform: Homophobia in the Black Community” (1983) 

The book Home Girls: A Black Feminist Anthology also includes one of Clarke’s essays, titled “The Failure to Transform: Homophobia in the Black Community” (1983). This essay is a literary critique, including critiques of LeRoi Jones’ Preface to a Twenty Volume Suicide Note (1961), Michele Wallace’s Black Macho and the Myth of the Superwoman (1979), and bell hooks’ Ain’t I a Woman (1981). Clarke argues that homophobia is not unique to the Black community, but is indicative of a larger homophobic culture. This piece is directed at Black men, who Clarke says perpetuate homophobia and the white supremacist, anti-Black concepts of gender and sexuality as a means of becoming more palatable to white America. She specifically critiques the “intellectual Black man” for acting as the savior that will bring liberation to the Black community by way of perpetuating homophobia to condemn Black lesbians as detrimental to the Black Family and Black nationhood (201). Additionally, Clarke asserts that intellectual Black women have excluded Black lesbians from their scholarship and subtly deny the womanhood of Black lesbians—“homophobia by omission”. The oppression and exclusion of Black lesbian women from the Black liberation movement, according to Clarke, is counter-revolutionary and only by addressing and eliminating homophobia can the Black community find liberation.

Clarke concludes that Black people must be committed to eliminating homophobia in the community by engaging in discussion with advocates for gay and lesbian liberation, educating ourselves about gay and lesbian politics, confronting homophobic attitudes within ourself and others, and understanding how these attitudes prevent us from being totally liberated.

"The Black Arts Movement and Cheryl Clarke." 
The Black Arts Movement took place between 1965-1975. This movement was in close connection with the Black Power movement and essentially sought to reimagine Western politics and cultural aesthetics. Emerging from this movement was also the consideration and inclusion of women as well as gay and lesbian artists. This emergence was partially a result of critiques of the movement along with prominent figures highlighting the literary and artistic contributions of these groups. Cheryl Clarke was known for both of these aspects. In her work, After Mecca, Clarke allowed for women poets and writers works to be showcased and, even further, she put queer characters at the center of her revolutionary fiction stories. Much of Clarke’s work in literature and in activism revolves around the idea of visibility. This is not far off from the objectives of the Black Arts and Black Power movement, but these movements struggled with representing the experience of the black woman. Clarke’s approach to power, politics, and identity was different, deliberate, and queer in its essence.

Community
Clarke has served on a number of boards and community organizations, including New York Women Against Rape (1985), New Jersey Women and AIDS Network, Center for Lesbian and Gay Studies at the CUNY Graduate Center, and the Astraea Lesbian Foundation for Justice. Currently, she is a member of the Board of Directors of the Newark Pride Alliance, a not-for-profit organization dedicated to LGBTQ advocacy and programming in the city of Newark, New Jersey. She lives and writes in Jersey City, New Jersey.

"Hobart Festival of Woman Writers" 
This festival was founded in the year 2013 and centers around recognizing published women writers. Each September, this organization offers a few days of reading and writing workshop and also offers opportunities to view art exhibitions and join discussion panels.

This is essential because it allows for constant visibility amongst a group of people who are often overlooked and dismissed. At this festival, women have the ability to reach audiences that thoroughly relate to them; Many are able to network and jumpstart their careers; Others simply exists in safe spaces. This festival has been around for the past 9 years and is still running successfully.

References

External links

1947 births
Living people
African-American women writers
African-American writers
American feminists
African-American feminists
Feminist studies scholars
LGBT African Americans
Lesbian feminists
American lesbian writers
Rutgers University faculty
Lesbian academics
American women academics
21st-century African-American people
21st-century African-American women
20th-century African-American people
21st-century American LGBT people
20th-century African-American women